Mills Elementary School or Mills Elementary may refer to: 

 Mills Elementary, in Austin, Texas, part of the Austin Independent School District
 Mills Elementary, in Klamath Falls, Oregon, part of Klamath Falls City School District
 Mills Elementary, in Owasso, Oklahoma, part of Owasso Public Schools
 Mills Elementary, in Casper, Wyoming, part of Natrona County School District Number 1
 Mills Elementary, in Sandusky, Ohio, Built 1953, Part of Sandusky City School District